"Jane" is a song by Barenaked Ladies from their 1994 album Maybe You Should Drive. The song was written by Stephen Duffy and Steven Page. The single release included the album version of "Jane", a live version of "What a Good Boy", and the Buck Naked version of "Great Provider". "Jane" reached number three on Canada's RPM Top Singles chart, topped the RPM Adult Contemporary chart for four weeks, and ended 1994 as the country's 17th best-selling single. The song later appeared on their 2001 compilation Disc One: All Their Greatest Hits.

Background
The title character is "Jane St. Clair", named after the intersection of Jane Street and St. Clair Avenue in Toronto. Steven Page recalls that co-writer Stephen Duffy saw the intersection on a map and remarked that it sounded like the most beautiful intersection in the world; Page "didn't wanna break his heart to tell him it wasn't." Page was also noted to have said, "the next song I'm gonna write is gonna be called Markham Ellesmere", the major suburban intersection of Markham Road and Ellesmere Road, which is close to where Page grew up in the Scarborough section of Toronto.

Page admits that the line "No Juliana next to my Evan" "dates [the song] a bit, [but] it still sounds pretty to me today."

Personnel
 Steven Page – lead and backing vocals, acoustic guitar
 Ed Robertson – acoustic and electric guitars, backing vocals
 Jim Creeggan – electric bass, backing vocals
 Andy Creeggan – hammered dulcimer, backing vocals
 Tyler Stewart – drums

Charts

Weekly charts

Year-end charts

References

1994 singles
1994 songs
Barenaked Ladies songs
Reprise Records singles
Songs written by Stephen Duffy
Songs written by Steven Page